Ernest Pearson Everett (31 October 1892 – 19 April 1967) was an Australian rules footballer who played with Geelong in the Victorian Football League (VFL).

Notes

External links 

1892 births
1967 deaths
Australian rules footballers from Victoria (Australia)
Geelong Football Club players